Aluminium-ion batteries are a class of rechargeable battery in which aluminium ions serve as charge carriers. Aluminium can exchange three electrons per ion. This means that insertion of one Al3+ is equivalent to three Li+ ions. Thus, since the ionic radii of Al3+ (0.54 Å) and Li+ (0.76 Å) are similar, significantly higher numbers of electrons and Al3+ ions can be accepted by cathodes with little damage. Al has 50 times (23.5 megawatt-hours m-3) the energy density of Li and is even higher than coal.

The trivalent charge carrier, Al3+ is both the advantage and disadvantage of this battery. While transferring 3 units of charge by one ion significantly increases the energy storage capacity, the electrostatic intercalation of the electrodes with a trivalent cation is too strong for well-defined electrochemical behaviour.

Rechargeable aluminium-based batteries offer the possibilities of low cost and low flammability, together with high capacity. Aluminum's inertness  and ease of handling in an ambient environment potentially offer significant safety improvements. Hence, aluminum-batteries have the potential to be smaller in size. Al-ion batteries may also have more charge-discharge cycles. Thus, Al-ion batteries have the potential to replace Li-ion batteries.

Design
Like all other batteries, aluminium-ion batteries include two electrodes connected by an electrolyte. Unlike lithium-ion batteries, where the mobile ion is Li+, aluminum forms a complex with chloride in most electrolytes and generates an anionic mobile charge carrier, usually AlCl4− or Al2Cl7−.

The amount of energy or power that a battery can release is dependent on factors including the battery cell's voltage, capacity and chemical composition. A battery can maximize its energy output levels by:
 Increasing chemical potential difference between the two electrodes
 Reducing the mass of reactants
 Preventing the electrolyte from being modified by the chemical reactions

Electrochemistry

Anode half reaction:
{Al} + {7AlCl4^-} <=> {4Al2Cl7^-} + {3e^-}

Cathode half reaction:
{2MnO2} + {Li+} + {e^-} <=> {LiMn2O4}

Combining the two half reactions yields the following reaction:
{Al} + {7AlCl4^-} + {6MnO2} + {3Li+} <=> {4Al2Cl7^-} + {3LiMn2O4}

Lithium-ion comparison
Aluminium-ion batteries are conceptually similar to lithium-ion batteries, but possess an aluminum charge carrier instead of lithium. While the theoretical voltage for aluminium-ion batteries is lower than lithium-ion batteries, 2.65 V and 4 V respectively, the theoretical energy density potential for aluminium-ion batteries is 1060 Wh/kg in comparison to lithium-ion's 406 Wh/kg limit.

Today's lithium ion batteries have high power density (fast charge/discharge) and high energy density (hold a lot of charge). They can also develop dendrites that can short-circuit and catch fire. Aluminum also transfers energy more efficiently because of its 3 electrons. Aluminium is more abundant/costs less than lithium, lowering material costs.

Challenges 
Aluminium-ion batteries to date have a relatively short shelf life. The combination of heat, rate of charge, and cycling can dramatically affect energy capacity. One of the reasons is the fracture of the graphite anode. Al ions are far larger than Li ions.

Ionic electrolytes, while improving safety and the long term stability of the devices by minimizing corrosion, are expensive and may therefore be unsuitable.

Research 

Various research teams are experimenting with aluminium to produce better batteries. Requirements include cost, durability, capacity, charging speed, and safety.

Anode

Cornell University 
In 2021, researchers announced a cell that used a 3D structured anode in which layers of aluminum accumulate evenly on an interwoven carbon fiber structure via covalent bonding as the battery is charged. The thicker anode features faster kinetics, and the prototype operated for 10k cycles without signs of failure.

Electrolyte

Oak Ridge National Laboratory
Around 2010, Oak Ridge National Laboratory (ORNL) developed and patented a high energy density device, producing 1,060 watt-hours per kilogram (Wh/kg). ORNL used an ionic electrolyte, instead of the typical aqueous electrolyte which can produce hydrogen gas and corrode the anode. The electrolyte was made of 3-ethyl-1-methylimidazolium chloride with excess aluminium trichloride. However, ionic electrolytes are less conductive, reducing power density. Reducing anode/cathode separation can offset the limited conductivity, but causes heating. ORNL devised a cathode made up of spinel manganese oxide that further reduced corrosion.

Cathode

Cornell University 
In 2011 a research team used the same electrolyte as ORNL, but used vanadium oxide nanowires for the cathode. Vanadium oxide has an open crystal structure with greater surface area and reduced path between cathode and anode. The device produced a large output voltage. However, the battery had a low coulombic efficiency.

Stanford University 
In April 2015 researchers at Stanford University claimed to have developed an aluminum-ion battery with a recharge time of about one minute (for an unspecified battery capacity). Their cell provides about 2 volts, 4 volts if connected in a series of two cells. The prototype lasted over 7,500 charge-discharge cycles with no loss of capacity.

The battery was made of an aluminum anode, liquid electrolyte, isolation foam, and a graphite cathode. During the charging process, AlCl4− ions intercalate among the graphene stacked layers. While discharging, AlCl4− ions rapidly de-intercalate through the graphite. The cell displayed high durability, withstanding more than 10,000 cycles without a capacity decay. The cell was stable, nontoxic, bendable and nonflammable.

In 2016, the lab tested these cells through collaborating with Taiwan's Industrial Technology Research Institute (ITRI) to power a motorbike using an expensive electrolyte. In 2017, a urea-based electrolyte was tested that was about 1% of the cost of the 2015 model. The battery exhibits ~99.7% Coulombic efficiency and a rate capability of 100 mA/g at a cathode capacity of 73 mAh/g (1.4 C).

ALION Project
In June 2015, the High Specific Energy Aluminium-Ion Rechargeable Batteries for Decentralized Electricity Generation Sources (ALION) project was launched by a consortium of materials and component manufacturers and battery assemblers as a European Horizon 2020 project led by the LEITAT research institute. The project objective is to develop a prototype Al-ion battery that could be used for large-scale storage from decentralized sources. The project sought to achieve an energy density of 400 Wh/kg, a voltage of 48 volts and a charge-discharge life of 3000 cycles. 3D printing of the battery packs allowed for large Al-ion cells developed, with voltages ranging from 6 to 72 volts.

University Of Maryland
In 2016, a University of Maryland team reported an aluminium/sulfur battery that utilizes a sulfur/carbon composite as the cathode. The chemistry  provides a theoretical energy density of 1340 Wh/kg. The prototype cell demonstrated energy density of 800 Wh/kg for over 20 cycles.

MIT 
In 2022, MIT researches reported a design that used cheap and nonflammable ingredients, including an aluminum anode and a sulfur cathode, separated by a molten chloro-aluminate salt  electrolyte. The prototype withstood hundreds of charge cycles, and charged quickly. This temperature can be maintained by the charge/discharge cycle. The salt has a low melting point and prevents dendrite formation. One potential application is at charging stations, where a pre-charged battery could allow the station to charge more vehicles simultaneously without a costly upgrade to the power line. Spinoff company Avanti, co-founded by one of the researchers, is attempting to commercialize the work.

Chalmers University of Technology and the National Institute of Chemistry in Slovenia 
In 2019 researchers proposed using anthraquinone for the cathode in an aluminum ion battery.

Queensland University of Technology 
In 2019 researchers from Queensland University of Technology developed cryptomelane based electrodes as cathode for Aluminum ion battery with an aqueous electrolyte.

Clemson University 
In 2017, researchers at Clemson Nanomaterials Institute used a graphene electrode to intercalate tetrachloroaluminate.  The team constructed batteries with aluminum anodes, pristine or modified few-layer graphene cathodes, and an ionic liquid with AlCl3 salt as the electrolyte. They claimed that the battery can operate over 10,000 cycles with an energy density of 200 Wh/kg.

Zhejiang University 
In December 2017 a Zhejiang University team announced a battery using graphene films as cathode and metallic aluminium as anode.

The 3H3C (Trihigh Tricontinuous) design results in a graphene film cathode with excellent electrochemical properties. Liquid crystal graphene formed a highly oriented structure. High temperature annealing under pressure produced a high quality and high channelling graphene structure. Claimed properties:

Retained 91.7 percent of original capacity after 250k cycles.
1.1 second charge time.
Temperature range: -40 to 120 C.
Current capacity: 111 mAh/g, 400 A/g 
Bendable and non-flammable.
Low energy density

Redox battery 
Another approach to an aluminum battery is to use redox reactions to charge and discharge. The charging process  converts aluminum oxide or aluminum hydroxide, into ionic aluminum, using electrolysis, typically at an aluminum smelter. One report estimated possible efficiency at around 65%. Although ionic aluminum oxidizes in the presence of air, this costs less than 1% of the energy storage capacity.

Discharging the battery involves oxidizing the aluminum, typically with water at temperatures less than 100 °C. This yields aluminum hydroxide and ionic hydrogen. The latter can produce electricity via a fuel cell. The oxidation in the fuel cell generates heat, which can support space or water heating.

A higher-temperature process could support industrial applications. It operates at over 200 °C, reacting aluminum with steam to generate aluminum oxide, hydrogen and additional heat.

The ionic aluminum could be stored at the smelter One approach charges the battery at a smelter, and discharges it wherever power and heat are needed. Alternatively, electricity could be fed into the grid at the smelter, without the need for transport, although for maximum round-trip efficiency, the heat would have to be used at the smelter site.

See also 
 Aluminium-air battery 
 Metal-air_battery
 Comparison of battery types
 List of battery types
 Energy density

References

External links
 
 Cathode materials for rechargeable aluminum batteries: current status and progress
 

Metal-ion batteries
Aluminium